Leandro da Silva is a Portuguese name and may refer to:

Football players

Brazil
Leandro Almeida Silva (footballer, born 1987) (born Leandro Almeida da Silva)
Leandro Castán (born Leandro Castán da Silva in 1986)
Leandro Cuca (born Leandro da Silva in 1973)
Leandro Donizete (born Leandro Donizete Gonçalves da Silva in 1982)
Leandro Gil Miranda da Silva (born 1978
Leandro Love, (born Leandro Rodrigues da Silva in 1985)
Leandro Mariano da Silva (born 1989)
Leandro Montera da Silva (born 1985)
Leandro Paulino da Silva (born 1986)
Leandro da Silva (footballer, born 1985)
Leandro da Silva (footballer, born 1989)
Leandro Silva (footballer, born 1988) (born Leandro da Silva)
Tigrão (born Leandro Antonio da Silva in 1982)

Portugal
Leandro Silva (Portuguese footballer) (born Leandro Miguel Pereira da Silva in 1994)

Other people
Leandro Araújo da Silva (born 1983), Brazilian volleyball player; see 2009 FIVB Volleyball Men's World Grand Champions Cup squads

See also
 Leandro Silva (disambiguation)